The 2011 Smart Card Open Monet+ was a professional tennis tournament played on outdoor clay courts. It was part of the 2011 ITF Women's Circuit, offering a total of $50,000+H in prize money. It took place in Zlín, Czech Republic, on 6–12 June 2011.

Singles entrants

Seeds 

 Rankings as of 23 May 2011

Other entrants 
The following players received wildcards into the singles main draw:
  Denisa Allertová
  Kateřina Klapková
  Katerina Kramperová
  Martina Kubičíková

The following players received entry from the qualifying draw:
  Yuliya Kalabina
  Zuzana Luknárová
  Lina Stančiūtė
  Zuzana Zlochová

The following player received entry into the singles main draw as a lucky loser:
  Diāna Marcinkēviča

Champions

Singles 

  Patricia Mayr-Achleitner def.  Ksenia Pervak 6–1, 6–0

Doubles 

  Yuliya Beygelzimer /  Margalita Chakhnashvili def.  Réka-Luca Jani /  Katalin Marosi 3–6, 6–1, [10–8]

References 
 Official website 
 2011 Smart Card Open Monet+ at ITFtennis.com

2011 ITF Women's Circuit
Clay court tennis tournaments
Tennis tournaments in the Czech Republic
2011 in Czech tennis